Myrna Lorrie (born Myrna Lorraine Petrunka, August 6, 1940, Cloud Bay, Ontario) is a Canadian country singer/songwriter/musician. She is known as the "first lady of Canadian country music."

Lorrie first sang publicly at age 11 on Fort William radio station CKPR on a program called School of the Air, whose host, Jack Masters,  gave Lorrie her own radio show, Harmony Trails, when she was just 12. At age 14 she wrote and recorded the song "Are You Mine" with Buddy DeVal, which was released on Abbott Records and reached number 6 on the Billboard Chart. The song became a hit in both Canada and the United States and was recorded by several artists; it peaked at No. 2 on the Billboard and Cashbox charts in early 1956. She was voted Best New Female Singer by fan polls in both Billboard and Cashbox magazines in 1955. The Lorrie/De Val team was a part of numerous Grand Ole Opry packages in 1956.

"Are You Mine" received the Song of the Year award from BMI in the US in 1955 and from BMI in Canada in 1976. The song is in BMI's Millionaire Club and became a worldwide standard in the country song category.

Biography

On January 10, 1957, Lorrie had her first recording session for RCA, at the RCA Victor Studio 1 in New York. Her first producer was Steve Sholes, who had signed Jim Reeves and The Browns, Hank Snow, Eddy Arnold, Chet Atkins and Elvis Presley. Nine months later, on October 31, 1957, Lorrie recorded at RCA Victor Studio on McGavock Street in Nashville, with Chester B. Atkins. The recording included a song written by Lorrie called "Tradewinds".

On first tour in the United States, she opened for stars such as Hank Snow, Marty Robbins, Johnny Cash, Kitty Wells, and Sonny James. She appeared on the Grand Ole Opry broadcast as a guest of Hank Snow. Later she toured with Faron Young. Skeeter Davis, Ferlin Husky, and Porter Wagoner.

Lorrie married and had two children, her son Tim, and daughter Carolee. During this period, she moonlighted as a DJ on CJLX, in her hometown of Fort William, Ontario. She hosted a popular three-hour slot of country and western music. She returned to performing in 1963, when she headlined the Atlantic Winter Fair; audiences loved her. She then formed The Myrna Lorrie Show, which toured on the Canadian country music circuit, playing fairs, small towns and the Calgary Stampede, until it disbanded in December 1968. 

Several hits for Columbia Records followed, including "Tell Me Not to Go", "Turn Down the Music", and "Changing of the Seasons". 

In the fall of 1969, CBC Halifax created a show called Countrytime. Lorrie was a guest during the first season and "she proved to be so charming that producer Cy True and the CBC brass invited her to co-host the show with Don Tremaine in the fall of 1970". She became a fixture on television in the 1970s, co-hosting Countrytime on CBC from 1970 to 1974 and Nashville Swing from 1977 to 1981. She briefly had her own show on CBC in 1974 called Country Sunshine With Myrna Lorrie. It was a three-part summer miniseries, which consisted of half-hour shows on July 25, August 1, and August 8, 1974. She also made appearances on the Ian Tyson Show and Grand Ole Country hosted by Ronnie Prophet. 

In addition to several other personal appearances, Lorrie performed at the National Arts Centre in Ottawa with Tommy Hunter in the summer of 1971. She was broadcast live by CBC Radio as one of the top entertainers performing at the Canadian Open Fiddle Contest in August. In 1976 she made an impressive appearance at the Mariposa Folk Festival on the Toronto Island. Where she was described as the "big surprise" of the festival by the press, and received standing ovations. In the mid-80s, she performed regularly as the headliner at Country Gold, at the Skyline Hotel in Toronto. 

Her 1989 release Blue Blue Me yielded the Canadian hits "Blue Blue Me" and "Sometime". 

She has scored six number one hits in Canada.

Lorrie made 36 appearances on Don Messer's Jubilee, and several on the Tommy Hunter Show.

Lorrie was awarded two Juno Awards for best female country singer, in 1970 and 1971. She was Best Female Singer and Entertainer of the Year at the inaugural Big Country Awards in 1977. She was among the inaugural inductees, along with her mentor Hank Snow, into the Canadian Country Music Hall of Fame on November 1, 1989 in Kitchener, Ontario; and the CCMA Hall of Honour on September 9, 1996.

In 2012, Bear Family Records acknowledged this Canadian country music pioneer's contribution by releasing a CD of her early recordings on their Juke Box Pearls series entitled  Myrna Lorrie, Hello Baby.

Discography

Albums

Singles

References

External links
 
 Entries at 45 cat.com

1940 births
Canadian women country singers
Canadian country singer-songwriters
Abbott Records artists
RCA Victor artists
Columbia Records artists
People from Thunder Bay District
Living people
Juno Award winners
Musicians from Ontario